The Foundation for a Smoke-Free World is an organization founded in 2017. It is funded by Philip Morris International, which had initial plans for $80 million in annual funding, with the aim of smoking harm reduction. The current pledge agreement from PMI to the Foundation, modified in September 2020, promises $35 million in funding to the Foundation from 2022 through 2029.

History 
In its first year, the Foundation spent more on public relations than on scientific research, but had not yet spent most of its yearly budget. Its president was Derek Yach, a former World Health Organization (and later PepsiCo) executive.

An investigation conducted by Le Monde (France), The Investigative Desk (Netherlands), Follow the money (Netherlands) and Knack, published in April 2021, suggests that the Foundation for a Smoke-Free World, which is not transparent about the grants it gives to other entities, is a lobbying tool used by Philip Morris International to circumvent the WHO Framework Convention on Tobacco Control, whose article 5.3 aims to protect public decisions from tobacco industry lobbying. According to the authors of the investigation, who relied on internal documents of Philip Morris International dated seven years prior in 2014, PMI's strategy consisted of dividing the tobacco control movement (schematically divided between "prohibitionists" and "pragmatists") and bending the WHO in order to promote alternative products (e-cigarettes, heated tobacco, etc.) to cigarettes.

At least one group of researchers who received funding from the Foundation allegedly failed to declare the funding and journals have been accused of neglecting to apply conflict of interest policies. The Center of Excellence for the Acceleration of Harm Reduction (CoEHAR) at the University of Catania is funded by the Foundation (through an intermediate company named ECLAT SRL) and some of its researchers (such as Riccardo Polosa) published tobacco-related papers without declaring funds received from the Foundation nor conflicts of interest. Advocacy groups directly or indirectly funded by the Foundation have stated that vaping with electronic cigarettes is a safer choice than smoking cigarettes, regarding the health effects of COVID-19.

On 28 September 2022, the second edition of the Tobacco Transformation Index (an initiative of FSFW) was released at the Global Tobacco & Nicotine Forum (GTNF) detailing the results of research into the efforts made by the world’s 15 largest tobacco companies to reduce the harm caused by the consumption of their products. The 2022 Index noted that high-risk products made up about 95% of retail sales in 2021, with reduced-risk products (RRPs) making up the remainder. It also noted that tobacco companies are failing to invest in harm reduction in low and middle-income countries, with sales of RRPs concentrated in markets with a high disposable income.

On 4 October 2022, it was reported that the Agricultural Transformation Initiative (ATI), a subsidiary of FSFW, supported Malawi-based scholars through the ATI Fellowship and Scholarship Fund. Fifteen postgraduate students shared information about their studies while speaking with experts and students at the North Carolina State University’s College of Agriculture and Life Sciences International Programs. The goal of the event was to use what the students learned to help diversify Malawi’s tobacco-reliant agricultural ecosystem.

On 31 January 2023, The Australian reported that research conducted by FSFW was published in Nicotine and Tobacco Research, appearing in a paper about patterns of tobacco use over the pandemic. The original paper was cited in further papers, causing the research to eventually be cited in more than 6700 papers.

Criticism 
The creation of the Foundation for a Smoke-Free World was met with skepticism by the medical community. The World Health Organization, Union for International Cancer Control and the American Cancer Society announced that they would not work with the Foundation, and encouraged governments and the public health community to follow their lead.

The independence of the Foundation for a Smoke-Free World has been challenged. The Foundation has been criticized by the Campaign for Tobacco-Free Kids, Action on Smoking and Health (ASH), Corporate Accountability International and others for taking funding from Philip Morris International.

Notes and references

See also 
 Conflicts of interest in academic publishing
 Disinformation
 Electronic cigarette and e-cigarette liquid marketing
 Front organization
 Advancement of Sound Science Center
 Center for Indoor Air Research
 Tobacco Institute
 Funding bias
 Manufactured controversy
 Merchants of Doubt
 Nicotine marketing
 Tobacco lobby

External links 
 Official website
 WHO Statement on the foundation
 Description on the platform Tobacco Tactics

Tobacco industry associations
Foundations based in the United States
Organizations established in 2017
2017 establishments in the United States
Tobacco in the United States
Front organizations